Pterolophia tsurugiana is a species of beetle in the family Cerambycidae. It was described by Masaki Matsushita in 1934.

References

tsurugiana
Beetles described in 1934